Sohrevard Rural District is in the Central District of Khodabandeh County, Zanjan province, Iran. At the National Census of 2006, its population was 6,317 in 1,472 households. There were 803 inhabitants in 203 households at the following census of 2011. At the most recent census of 2016, the population of the rural district was 382 in 108 households. The largest of its six villages was Madabad, with 178 people.

References 

Khodabandeh County

Rural Districts of Zanjan Province

Populated places in Zanjan Province

Populated places in Khodabandeh County